Swimming at the 2010 Asian Games was held at the Aoti Aquatics Centre in Guangzhou, China from November 13 to 18, 2010. This Aquatics discipline had 38 long course events: 19 for males and 19 for females.

Schedule

Medalists

Men

Women

Medal table

Participating nations
A total of 294 athletes from 36 nations competed in swimming at the 2010 Asian Games:

References

External links
Swimming Site of 2010 Asian Games

 
2010 Asian Games events
Asian Games
2010